Allenson is a surname. Notable people with the surname include:

Gary Allenson (born 1955), American baseball manager, player, and coach
John Allenson (born  1558), English theologian

See also
Allen (disambiguation)
Allens (disambiguation)
Allinson
Alson